The 13th Reserve Division (13. Reserve-Division) was a unit of the Imperial German Army in World War I. The division was formed on the mobilization of the German Army in August 1914. The division was disbanded in 1919, during the demobilization of the German Army after World War I. The division was a reserve division of the VII Reserve Corps and was recruited primarily in the Province of Westphalia.

Combat chronicle

The 13th Reserve Division fought on the Western Front, participating in the opening German offensive which led to the Allied Great Retreat, including the capture of Maubeuge. Thereafter, the division remained in the line in the Aisne region until December 1915, when it went to the Verdun region. It entered the Battle of Verdun in February, and remained there until September. After the battle, the division remained in the line at Verdun. It went to the Champagne region at the end of 1916, and remained there into 1917, fighting in the Second Battle of the Aisne, also called the Third Battle of Champagne, in April–May 1917. After a few months near Reims, the division returned to the Verdun region in September, remaining there until April 1918 except for a month in Army reserve. The division then went to Belgium, and was in Flanders until the war's end. Allied intelligence rated the division as mediocre in 1917, but first class in 1918.

Order of battle on mobilization

The order of battle of the 13th Reserve Division on mobilization was as follows:
 25. Reserve-Infanterie-Brigade
 Reserve-Infanterie-Regiment Nr. 13
 Reserve-Infanterie-Regiment Nr. 56
 28. Reserve-Infanterie-Brigade
 Reserve-Infanterie-Regiment Nr. 39
 Reserve-Infanterie-Regiment Nr. 57
 Reserve-Jäger-Bataillon Nr. 7
 Reserve-Husaren-Regiment Nr. 5
 Reserve-Feldartillerie-Regiment Nr. 13
 4.Kompanie/Pionier-Bataillon Nr. 7

Order of battle on July 12, 1918

The 13th Reserve Division was triangulated in March 1915. Over the course of the war, other changes took place, including the formation of artillery and signals commands and a pioneer battalion. The order of battle on July 12, 1918, was as follows:
 28. Reserve-Infanterie-Brigade
 Reserve-Infanterie-Regiment Nr. 13
 Reserve-Infanterie-Regiment Nr. 39
 Reserve-Infanterie-Regiment Nr. 57
 3.Eskadron/Reserve-Husaren-Regiment Nr. 5
 Artillerie-Kommandeur 100
 Reserve-Feldartillerie-Regiment Nr. 13
 I.Bataillon/Reserve-Fußartillerie-Regiment Nr. 22
 Stab Pionier-Bataillon Nr. 313
 4.Kompanie/Pionier-Bataillon Nr. 7
 Pionier-Kompanie Nr. 287
 Minenwerfer-Kompanie Nr. 213
 Divisions-Nachrichten-Kommandeur 413

References
 13. Reserve-Division (Chronik 1914/1918) - Der erste Weltkrieg
 Hermann Cron et al., Ruhmeshalle unserer alten Armee (Berlin, 1935)
 Hermann Cron, Geschichte des deutschen Heeres im Weltkriege 1914-1918 (Berlin, 1937)
 Günter Wegner, Stellenbesetzung der deutschen Heere 1815-1939. (Biblio Verlag, Osnabrück, 1993), Bd. 1
 Histories of Two Hundred and Fifty-One Divisions of the German Army which Participated in the War (1914-1918), compiled from records of Intelligence section of the General Staff, American Expeditionary Forces, at General Headquarters, Chaumont, France 1919 (1920)

Notes

Infantry divisions of Germany in World War I
Military units and formations established in 1914
Military units and formations disestablished in 1919
1914 establishments in Germany